The Tonga Football Association is the governing body of football in Tonga. It oversees the Tonga national football team, Tonga Major League and the Tonga Cup in international and club football respectively.

External links
 Official website. 
 Tonga at the FIFA website.
 Tonga at OFC site
 Tonga national football team picture

Tonga
Football in Tonga
Football
Sports organizations established in 1965